Mohamed Abderrahime Belarbi (born 8 August 1992) is an Algerian badminton player who trained at the Chantecler club in Bordeaux, France. He competed at the 2010 Singapore Summer Youth Olympics. He was one of the 14 players selected for the Road to Rio Program, a program that aimed to help African badminton players to compete at the 2016 Olympic Games. Belarbi won the men's doubles title at the 2018 African Championships.

Achievements

African Championships 
Men's doubles

BWF International Challenge/Series 
Men's doubles

  BWF International Challenge tournament
  BWF International Series tournament
  BWF Future Series tournament

References

External links 
 

1992 births
Living people
Algerian male badminton players
Badminton players at the 2010 Summer Youth Olympics
Competitors at the 2011 All-Africa Games
Competitors at the 2015 African Games
Competitors at the 2019 African Games
African Games silver medalists for Algeria
African Games medalists in badminton
Competitors at the 2022 Mediterranean Games
Mediterranean Games competitors for Algeria
21st-century Algerian people
20th-century Algerian people